Cannabis in Mali is illegal.

History
Mali's laws against cannabis were based on French colonial-era laws.

Traditional uses
In Mali, cannabis was considered an aphrodisiac.

Economy
Mali is part of a cannabis resin smuggling route that leads from Morocco to Egypt and Sudan, and onward to Europe. The networks are largely run by Malian Arabs who have community ties to Mauritania and Niger.

References

Mali
Drugs in Mali